2014 European Parliament elections were held in Slovenia on 25 May 2014. It was the first in the series of three elections held in the 2014, and the major test leading up to the parliamentary elections in July. The political atmosphere was in a crisis that started with the fall of Borut Pahor's government, then Janez Janša's government in 2013, the latter coming after Janša was accused of corruption. The cabinet of Alenka Bratušek was breaking up, as the former leader of the Positive Slovenia Zoran Janković, who was under the suspicion of corruption, announced his candidature for party president, even though the coalition parties threatened to leave the government if he was to be elected, which later he was.

The main characteristic of the elections was the participation of several new parties, founded during the recent years of crisis. Verjamem was among the last parties to be founded before the elections, and surprisingly finished in third place, winning one seat in the European Parliament.

Candidates

Opinion polls 
Poll results are listed in the table below in reverse chronological order, showing the most recent first. The highest percentage figure in each polling survey is displayed in bold, and the background shaded in the leading party's colour. In the instance that there is a tie, then no figure is shaded. The lead column on the right shows the percentage-point difference between the two parties with the highest figures. Poll results use the date the survey's fieldwork was done, as opposed to the date of publication. However, if such date is unknown, the date of publication will be given instead.

Notes

Results
The election was severely won by the right pole parties, winning 5 of the 8 seats for the European People's Party (EPP). Igor Šoltes won one seat for The Greens–European Free Alliance (Greens-EFA), whose member the party became after the election. Ivo Vajgl won a seat for the new Slovenian European party Democratic Party of Pensioners (DeSUS), which became member of the Alliance of Liberals and Democrats for Europe Party, after election in the European Parliament. The leader of the Social Democrats (SD) Igor Lukšič, was not elected in the parliament even though he was the president of the party and its main candidate. He was beaten by Tanja Fajon by preferential voting with 11.691 against 6.882 votes for her party colleague.

Aftermath

A candidate for the presidency of the European Commission Jean-Claude Juncker wished to have a name of the candidate for the new Slovenian commissioner until 1 August 2014. A huge debate took place right after the election and was a played a part of the pre-election time. Bratušek, who was still a prime minister at the moment, wished to send a name of the candidate by herself, which was strongly opposed by the leader of SMC Miro Cerar. After his victory on the parliamentary elections, he proposed the current commissioner Janez Potočnik as a potential common candidate of the government and the potential new coalition parties. The government placed his proposal on the list of candidates along with the Prime Minister Alenka Bratušek (ZaAB), Karl Erjavec (DeSUS-ALDE) and Tanja Fajon (SD-PES). The actual commissioner withdrew his candidature, as he did not agree with the multitude of the candidates. The self nomination of Alenka Bratušek caused even bigger storm in Slovenian political atmosphere, as many saw her move as an act of private interest. Her action is now under investigation by Commission for the Prevention of Corruption of the Republic of Slovenia (KPK). Driven by decisive victory on the election to European parliament, the Slovenian MEP's members of the EPP, Milan Zver (SDS), Alojz (Lojze) Peterle (NSi), Franc Bogovič (SLS), Romana Tomc (SDS) and Patricija Šulin (SDS) wrote a letter of complaint and concern to Jean-Claude Juncker expressing regret as none of the proposed potential commissioner is not a member of the triumphant EPP. Miro Cerar was displeased with the expulsion of Janez Potočnik from the race for the European commissioner, and announced his reaction as soon as he will be named and confirmed as a Prime Minister-designate on 25 August 2014.  Cerar, as the newly named Prime Minister-designate, declared his first action will be a letter to Juncker in which he shall consult the candidate for the new leader of European Commission. In the background a big lobbying battle took place, as Tanja Fajon, strongly supported by PES, has been invited to formal conversation with Juncker. Karl Erjavec also announced a meeting with potential leader of the Commission after the appointment of presidents of the European Council on 30 August. Janez Potočnik returned to the race, after SMC refused co-operation with ZaAB in the new coalition, but was soon backed out by the original trio of candidates (Bratušek, Erjavec and Fajon). Prime minister designate Cerar announced his support to Fajon and Erjavec, but ex prime minister Bratušek did not back down and continued lobbying in the European parliament, looking for support among the European parties. Juncker soon named Bratušek a Vice-President of the European Commission designate and a European Commissioner for Energy designate, but she faced big opposition both in European parliament and in Slovenia, as the people did not support her candidature. She faced a hearing in front of the representatives of the European Parliament on 6. of October. European MP's were not impressed by her presentation and vision for the Energy Union so they refused her as a candidate for the named position and asked Juncker to replacer her or name her on a new position. Under an investigation of Commission for the Prevention of Corruption of the Republic of Slovenia and huge pressure from Slovenia, Bratušek finally resigned as the candidate for Commissioner from Slovenia on 9. of October 2014. New Cerar's government named ex Minister without Portfolio responsible for Development, Strategic Projects and Cohesion Violeta Bulc, who was confirmed as a candidate for European Commissioner for Transport and later also passed the hearing in front of the European MP's. Bulc assumed her new position on 1 November 2014.

References

2014
2014 in Slovenia
Slovenia